Zhao Jun (born 21 February 1967) is a Chinese cross-country skier. He competed in the men's 15 kilometre classical event at the 1988 Winter Olympics.

References

1967 births
Living people
Chinese male cross-country skiers
Olympic cross-country skiers of China
Cross-country skiers at the 1988 Winter Olympics
Place of birth missing (living people)